Ahl Al-Sham was a joint command structure and umbrella organization of four main Syrian opposition factions operating in Aleppo, Syria. The factions are:
Syria's largest rebel group, the Islamic Front
the al-Qaeda-affiliated al-Nusra Front
the foreign Russian-speaking jihadist group Jaish al-Muhajireen wal-Ansar
and the anti-ISIL coalition, the Army of Mujahedeen. 
The group has held talks with the People's Protection Units and Jabhat al-Akrad; they have agreed to a truce in order to focus on fighting the Assad government.

The groups involved in the structure are perceived differently by the United States; while Al-Nusra Front and Jaish al-Muhajireen wal-Ansar are designated as terrorist organizations by the United States. In contrast Islamic Front is considered by the United States as a "moderate" fighting force and the Army of Mujahedeen is being vetted by them to receive support.

In late October 2014, the al-Nusra Front began attacking cities held by the Free Syrian Army and other moderate Islamist groups, in an attempt to establish its own Islamic state with imposed Sharia rule.

In December 2014, the Levant Front coalition was established, possibly superseding Ahl al-Sham. It includes the Islamic Front and the Army of Mujahideen but excludes al-Nusra and Jaish al-Muhajireen wal-Ansar. The Aleppo Liberation operations room was established in February 2015; it includes Jaish al-Muhajireen wal-Ansar as part of the Jabhat Ansar al-Din.

See also
 List of armed groups in the Syrian Civil War
 Army of Conquest

References

Anti-government factions of the Syrian civil war
Operations rooms of the Syrian civil war